Edward Martyn (30 January 1859 – 5 December 1923) was an Irish playwright and early republican political and cultural activist, as the first president of Sinn Féin from 1905–08.

Early life
Martyn was the elder son of John Martyn of Tullira Castle, Ardrahan and Annie Mary Josephine (née Smyth) of Masonbrook, Loughrea, both of County Galway. He succeeded his father upon John's death in 1860. He was educated at Belvedere College, Dublin, and Wimbledon College, London, both Jesuit schools, after which he entered Christ Church, Oxford in 1877, but left without taking a degree in 1879.  His only sibling, John, died in 1883.

Patron of the Arts

Martyn began writing fiction and plays in the 1880s. While his own output was undistinguished, he acquired a well-earned reputation as a noted connoisseur of music, both European classical and Irish traditional. He was a fine musician in his own right, giving memorable performances for guests on an organ he had installed at Tullira. Martyn used his wealth to benefit Irish culture. His activities and sponsorships included:
 foundation of the Palestrina Choir (the resident choir at the St Mary's Pro-Cathedral, Dublin) in 1903
 funding and direction of St. Brendan's Cathedral, Loughrea 
 co-founder and endowing of the Feis Ceoil 
 president of Na hAisteoirí, the Irish-language drama group 
 sponsored and guided An Túr Gloine, Ireland's first stained-glass workshop 
 sponsored the Irish Theatre, Thomas MacDonagh's theatre (1914–1916) presenting European and Irish-language work in Countess Plunkett's hall in Hardwicke Street

The Irish Literary Theatre

Martyn was reportedly pivotal in introducing William Butler Yeats and Lady Gregory to each other in 1896. The three founded the Irish Literary Theatre, for whom Martyn wrote his best and most popular plays The Heather Field and A Tale of a Town. He covered the costs of the company's first three seasons, which proved crucial to establishing the company and the future of the Abbey Theatre. He later parted ways with Yeats and Gregory, something he later regretted, but remained on warm terms with Lady Gregory till the end of his life.

George Moore

Martyn was a cousin and friend to George Moore (1852–1933). The two, both lifelong bachelors, made frequent trips all over Europe, where Moore influenced Martyn's views on modern art, which resulted in the latter purchasing several works by Degas, Monet, Corot and Utamaro (all later donated to the National Gallery of Ireland). The two attended performances at Bayreuth, as Martyn was a devotee of Wagner. 

Their relationship was often antagonistic. The Moores were old literary family, Anglo-Irish (and Protestant until the generation preceding George Moore's birth), from the west of Ireland, and with Whiggish tendencies. 

Moore wrote an insightful account of Martyn in his  Hail and Farewell. He did not share Martyn's fenian ideas nor espousal of violent means to achieve national sovereignty. The cousins' political differences eventually drove their friendship apart. In later years they were no longer on speaking terms.

Republicanism

Martyn was descended from Richard Óge Martyn (c. 1604 – 1648), a leading Irish Confederate, and Oliver Óge Martyn (c.1630 – c.1709), a Jacobite who fought in the Williamite War in Ireland. Yet by his lifetime, the family were unionists. Martyn's outlook began to change in the 1880s after studying Irish history, as well as living through the events of the Irish Land War. He came out as an Irish republican when he famously refused to allow "God Save The Queen" to be sung after a dinner party at Tullira. 

By this stage he was involved with the political work of Maud Gonne and Arthur Griffith, and was a vocal opponent of the visit of Queen Victoria to Ireland in 1897. He also protested the visit by Edward VII in 1903, this time as chairman of the People's Protection Committee. He was the first president of Sinn Féin from 1905-08 (the party only taking that name in the latter year). In 1908, he resigned from the party and politics in general to concentrate on writing and his other activities. He became close friends with Griffith, funding the publication of the latter's The Resurrection of Hungary in 1904. 

In 1906, he was at the centre of a well-publicised court case over an off-the-cuff remark that any Irishman who joined the British Army should be flogged. This led to his suspension by the Kildare Street Club, of which he was a member. The court case was resolved in his favour. Martyn stated that he only pursued the case to continue membership as it served the best caviar in Dublin. 

He was on close personal terms with Thomas MacDonagh, Joseph Mary Plunkett and Patrick Pearse, and deeply mourned their executions in the aftermath of the Easter Rising. A parish hall and church that he founded at Labane, near Tullira, were burned by the Black and Tans. He supported the Anglo-Irish Treaty of 1921.

Death

Martyn died at Tullira on 5 December 1923, aged 64, after years of ill health.  Friends and family were shocked at a provision in his will that directed that his body be donated for the use of medical science and, after dissection, be buried in an unmarked pauper's grave.  The Palestrina Choir sang at his graveside.  His papers he bequeathed to the Carmelites of Clarendon Street in Dublin, who subsequently misplaced and lost them.  Portraits of Martyn exist by, among others, John Butler Yeats and Sarah Purser.  On his death the senior line of the Martyn family died out. His property was inherited by his cousins, the Smyths of Masonbrook and Lord Hemphill.  Tullira was sold by the latter forty years later changing ownership several times since.

Extracts from Lady Gregory's Journals
 Sunday 25 September 1921 (pp. 294–95) – And in the afternoon we drove to Tillyra, and Edward sent them [Anne and Catherine, Lady Gregory's granddaughters] into the Castle with Owen, and let them play the organ in the hall and gave us tea and was very pleasant, thought Catherine very like Velasquez Prince on horseback; approves of my keeping on Coole but thinks I have great courage. He is not very hopeful of a settlement, but he is never hopeful, but he praises the leaders, De V. and McNeill and Barton especially. And indeed one feels more pride in being represented by them in England than by the British Cabinet in Europe! He says George Moore is really angry about Miss Mitchell's life of him, and told him "Boyd is to do the official life"; but Edward says "that will make no difference, Miss Mitchell's will always be the real one accepted, she took the only possible way of dealing with you, treating you as Mon ami Moore. Edward is sorry he didn't build a Theatre twenty years ago, and "put the key in his pocket." ... He is anxious about money, has fears of his investment in the English railways, and is very crippled with rheumatism.
 14 January 1922 (pp. 323–324) – On the way to the Abbey Theatre, over the Bridge, there was a great crowd, I asked what was going on and a young man said "It's the Tans ... – on their departure! ... I had been to see Edward Martyn in the afternoon in his warm little flat; very crippled, but more cheerful than I had seen him for a long time at the exit of the Tans. He is all for the Treaty and blames De Valera's doings here as much as he had admired them in America. He will listen to no excuse, says "he is jealous of Griffith. I met him in Gort at the time of his Clare election. I was doing my marketing and he and another had come to hold a meeting there, and I talked to them in their motor and I said 'You will get on all right as long as you hold to Griffith and keep him with you' and I saw a shadow pass across their faces." ... He says M. Collins made an inspection of the Volunteers all through Ireland before he went on the London mission, and came to the conclusion that we were not in a position to fight. When they brought the signed Treaty back (and this I had heard from others) no one in the Cabinet made an objection. But suddenly some days later De V. sent his protest to the Press.
 September 1923 (p. 475) – Edward Martyn had been ill for sometime and on 8 September I wrote to A.W. "On the way back from Galway we got to Tillyra about 6.30. The chauffeur had never been there before and instead of stopping at the hall door drove a little past it, and there, in the bow window of the library I saw Edward sitting. I thought he would turn or look round at the noise but he stayed quite immovable, like a stuffed figure, it was quite uncanny. I rang the bell and Dolan the butler appears, said he was "only pretty well", but showed me into the drawing room, and came back to say Edward would like to see me. I went in; he did not turn his head, gazed before him. I touched his hands (one could not shake them – all crippled, Dolan says he has to be fed) and spoke to him. He slowly turned his eyes but apparently without recognition. I went on talking without response till I asked if he had any pain and he whispered "No – thank God". I didn't know if he knew me, but talked a little, and presently he whispered "How is Robert?" I said "He is well, as all are in god's hands. He has gone before me and before you". then I said "My little grandson Richard is well", and he said with difficulty and in a whisper "I am very glad of that". Then I came away, there was no use staying ... It was a very sad visit. That was the last time I saw Edward Martyn, and I grieve for him.
 7 December 1923 (p. 494) – Yesterday I took the children to a party at Ballyturnin, very merry for them. But I heard of Edward Martyn's death, it had taken place that morning. The Doctor told Mr. Bagot a tumour had been taken from his head on Saturday, Dr. McGuinness had come from Dublin for the operation and he [Martyn] lost a good deal of blood. Father O'Kelly said he had after the operation recognised Father Carr, which he had not done for some time. I asked about the funeral. He said Father Carr told him also he had bequeathed his body to the Dublin doctors "in the interests of science" so it may probably be in Dublin. ... I feel a loneliness now he is gone. He was from the beginning of my life here at Coole a good neighbour; he was always grateful for my husband's interest in him. He had gone to see Edward at Oxford to advise him not to build that large addition to his old castle, until at least his own taste and opinion were formed; and though the forces were too strong, his mother and her surroundings, he often regretted that he had not the strength of mind to take that advice.  He was very kind to Robert, giving him his first real gun and letting him and his friends shoot [at] Tillyra in the holidays.  And then, when Yeats' summers, and the theatre project began, he was constantly here, walking over and staying to dine.  It was George Moore who broke that work together, putting his own name on the "Bending of the Bough", rewritten by him and Yeats but on Edward's foundation.  And Edward had been weak about The Countess Cathleen, and took a wrong turning I think in withdrawing his support from our Theatre.  Of late I was told he felt his support of Sinn Féin in its beginning had been wrong, it was on his conscience.  And yet he hated, with a real hatred, England.  I always felt there were two natures in him, the old blood of the Martyns and the blood of the Smiths.
 11 December 1923 – Poor Edward. His body has been taken to Dublin to be dissected, by direction of his will. He directed the Dr. should visit it each day till removal to make sure he really was dead. But if he meant by giving it to the School of Medicine to perhaps save some other sufferer from what he has gone through (no doctor seeming to know what was wrong or able to help him) it was a fine thing to do.  There is a nice notice of him in "The Times", better than he would have gained by following his family's wishes and settling down to marry and entertain the County.

See also
 Oliver Óge Martyn
 Richard Óge Martyn

References

Bibliography

External links
 

1859 births
1923 deaths
19th-century Irish people
20th-century Irish people
Abbey Theatre
Deaths from cancer in the Republic of Ireland
Deaths from brain tumor
Irish dramatists and playwrights
Irish male dramatists and playwrights
Irish republicans
People from County Galway
Early Sinn Féin politicians
Leaders of Sinn Féin
Irish patrons of music
Irish patrons of literature
People educated at Belvedere College